Schwarzer Engel is a German metal band formed in 2007. They have released seven full-length albums as of January 2022. Their seventh studio album, Sieben, is their first album to make the German official charts, landing at 59th for a week.

Members 
 Dave Jason – vocals, guitar, drums
 Vincent Hübsch – guitar (live)
 Timo Joos – guitar (live)
 Bert Oeler – bass (live)
 Tino Calmbach – drums (live)

Discography

Studio albums 
 Apokalypse (2010)
 Träume einer Nacht (2011)
 In brennenden Himmeln (2013)
 Imperium I (2015)
 Imperium II (2016)
 Kult der Krähe (2018)
 Sieben (2022)

References

External links 
 Official website
 Official Facebook account

2007 establishments in Germany
German industrial metal musical groups
German Neue Deutsche Härte music groups
German gothic metal musical groups
German symphonic metal musical groups